Romana Labounková (born April 27, 1989) is a Czech racing cyclist who represents the Czech Republic in BMX. She represented the Czech Republic at the 2012 Summer Olympics in the women's BMX event, finishing in 11th place.

References

External links 
 
 
 
 
 
 
 The Official website of Czech BMX
 
 The Personal website of Romana Labounkova
 The Official website of UEC

1989 births
Living people
BMX riders
Czech female cyclists
Olympic cyclists of the Czech Republic
Cyclists at the 2012 Summer Olympics
European Games competitors for the Czech Republic
Cyclists at the 2015 European Games